Real Aikido (Serbian Cyrillic: Реални аикидо) is a martial art developed by Ljubomir Vračarević, a self-defence instructor from Serbia. It is a mixture of aikido, judo and jujutsu techniques, with some modifications made by Vračarević.

Techniques

The Real Aikido defense system includes unarmed techniques, as well as defense against weapons such as knife, pistol, etc. It includes of aikido, judo and jujutsu, techniques simplified so that they can be easily taught in security and self-defense courses. The curriculum itself is mainly based on a general aikido curriculum, with a kyu/dan system of grading. Apart from grappling, self-defense against strikes also includes evasion and some blocking techniques.

Bodyguard school
Vracarevic's bodyguard school is officially certified by the International Bodyguard and Security Services Association (IBSSA).

Use in Serbian schools
From 2005 Real Aikido was included in elementary school curriculum in Serbia as an elective subject.

International recognition
 In 2001, Vladimir Djordjevic Chief Instructor of United States Center of Real Aikido and founder of Odbrana was recognized by United States Martial Arts Association. 
 In 2003, Real Aikido was recognized by United States Martial Arts Hall of Fame 
 In 2005 CBS 2 Chicago TV Station aired the Chief Instructor Vladimir Mr.V Djordjevic at United States Center Of Real Aikido, on Rape Prevention issues.
 In October 2007 Real Aikido practitioners entered the first European Martial Arts Hall of Fame. 
 The United States Center of Real Aikido is member of International Combat Martial Arts Unions Association.

Ranks and grades

References

External links
 World Centre of Real Aikido
 Real Aikido
 Odbrana

Serbian martial arts
European martial arts
Aikido organizations